Frank Rosenwein (born 1978) is an American classical oboist.

Early life and education 
Rosenwein was born in Evanston, Illinois. He pursued his undergraduate studies at the Cleveland Institute of Music, where he studied with former Cleveland Orchestra principal oboe John Mack. He received his Master of Music from the Juilliard School.

Career 
Rosenwein was principal oboe of the San Diego Symphony and San Diego Opera from 2002 to 2005 and was guest principal oboe with the Chicago Symphony Orchestra. As of 2005, he has been the principal oboe of the Cleveland Orchestra. Since 2006, he has been head of the oboe department at the Cleveland Institute of Music.

Personal life 
He is the son of the medieval historian and academic Barbara H. Rosenwein.

References

1978 births
Living people
Musicians from Cleveland
American classical oboists
Cleveland Institute of Music faculty
Cleveland Institute of Music alumni
Juilliard School alumni
Classical musicians from Ohio

People from Evanston, Illinois
Musicians from Evanston, Illinois
Musicians from Illinois
Classical musicians from Illinois